Émile Goudeau (29 August 1849 – 18 September 1906) was a French journalist, novelist and poet. He was the founder of the Hydropathes literary club.

Life

He was born in Périgueux, Dordogne, the son of Germain Goudeau, an architect, and cousin of Léon Bloy. Goudeau studied at the seminary, and then was supervisor in different high schools before becoming an employee at the Ministry of Finance, 
which gave him the opportunity to devote most of his time to poetry.

According to Maurice Donnay:

Goudeau founded the Hydropathes society on 11 October 1878. 
According to Goudeau, the name came from the Hydropathen-valsh (Waltz of the Hydropaths) by the Hungarian-German musician Joseph Gungl.
The purpose of the society was to promote the works of the members. 
The Hydropathes Café in the rue Cujas was a large hall that could accommodate several hundred people.
The society staged evening entertainments in the form of poetry or prose readings and songs.
The society published a journal for about year, starting in January 1879, containing writings and pictures by members of the society.

The Hydropathes drank heavily in the bohemian way of that time, particularly green absinthe, which was rampant.
Goudeau paid his collaborators in drink, and this salary was fatal to the most gifted of them, Jules Jouy.
At first the Hydropathes met on the Left Bank, but when Rodolphe Salis opened his cabaret, Le Chat Noir, in December 1881, 
he persuaded Goudeau to move the society there.
Goudeau helped Salis to launch his journal Le Chat Noir, which first appeared on 14 January 1882, drawing on his experience with the Hydropathes journal. Goudeau was chief editor of Le Chat Noir from 1882 to 1884.

Much of the Hydropathes' backstory -- including the name, the music, the drinking, the performances, the poetry, etc., the many poets, musicians, and performers (famous and not so famous), as well as the reasons for organizing it in the first place, -- is found in Goudeau's memoir, Dix ans de bohème. The ten years in question are most likely 1874-1884, which is from the time Goudeau first arrived in Paris (1874), "très timide de tempérament, très audacieux de volonté" ("very timid in temperament, very audacious in will"), to when he left his position of chief editor at Le Chat Noir journal.

Works

1878: Fleurs du bitume (In English translation: Flowers of Bitumen: Sunny Lou Publishing, 2021)
1884: Poèmes ironiques (Ironic Poems)
1884: La Revanche des bêtes (Revenge of the beasts)
1885: La Vache enragée (The Angry Cow): novel
1886: Voyages et découvertes du célèbre A'Kempis à travers les États-Unis de Paris (Travels and discoveries of famous A'Kempis across the United States from Paris): Fantasy, with drawings by Henri Rivière
1887: Les Billets bleus (The Blue Tickets): novel
1887: Le Froc: novel
1888: Dix ans de bohème (Ten bohemian years): memoirs, The Illustrated Library, Paris, 1888; reissued by Champ Vallon, Paris, 2000. (In English translation: Ten Years a Bohemian: Sunny Lou Publishing, 2021)
1889: Corruptrice (Corrupter): novel
1893: Paris qui consomme (The Paris who consumes) : fantasy
1896: Chansons de Paris et d'ailleurs (Songs of Paris and elsewhere)
1897: Poèmes parisiens (Parisian Poems)
1900: La Graine humaine (The Human Grain): novel

Tribute

The Place Émile-Goudeau in the 18th arrondissement of Paris is named in his honor. It is on Montmartre hill just below the Place du Tertre.

English-language translations
Flowers of Bitumen. Publisher: Sunny Lou Publishing, 2021.
Ten Years a Bohemian. Publisher: Sunny Lou Publishing, 2021.
Upside-Down Stories. Compiled and translated by Doug Skinner (Black Scat Books, 2019).

References
Notes

Citations

Sources

People from Périgueux
1849 births
1906 deaths
19th-century French journalists
French male poets
19th-century French poets
19th-century French male writers
French male non-fiction writers